KNCT may refer to:

 KNCT-FM, a radio station (91.3 FM) licensed to Killeen, Texas, United States
 KNCT (TV), a television station (channel 17, virtual 46) licensed to Belton, Texas, United States